Sugisaki (written: 杉崎 or 杉咲) is a Japanese surname. Notable people with the surname include::

, Japanese actress
, Japanese announcer, radio personality, entertainer and actress
, Japanese manga artist

Fictional characters
, protagonist of the light novel series Seitokai no Ichizon

See also
Sugisaki Station, a railway station in Hida, Gifu Prefecture, Japan

Japanese-language surnames